Bacalieu Island is an island off Twillingate in Newfoundland. It has a lighthouse. In 1911, it was inhabited by the lighthouse keepers and their families.

See also
List of lighthouses in Canada
List of communities in Newfoundland and Labrador

References

External links
 Buoys, Lights and Aids to Navigation Canadian Coast Guard
 Picture of the lighthouse

Islands of Newfoundland and Labrador
Lighthouses in Newfoundland and Labrador